Kongwak  is a small town in Victoria, Australia. It is located on the Korumburra to Wonthaggi Road southeast of Melbourne, in the South Gippsland Shire. At the 2016 census, Kongwak had a population of 197.

The town in conjunction with neighbouring township Inverloch has an Australian Rules football team competing in the Alberton Football League.

The Kongwak Market is held every Sunday with collectables, retro, vintage and second hand items, plants, and books.

History 
The land around Kongwak was largely cleared of native vegetation and is now used for agriculture, including dairying. This land was cleared by two brothers, Richard Nutter Scott and Frederick John Scott. Richard's memorial park can be seen on the Kongwak tennis grounds.

Kongwak Post Office opened on 11 May 1898.

Williams St is prominent in the Main St with three brothers; Alfred, George, and William all serving in the first World War.

Terrestrial woodlice of the species Porcellio scaber are present in the area, and were photographed by students of Kongwak Primary School in 2020, who submitted their observation to citizen science website iNaturalist. Signs of disease in this submission inspired scientific investigation, which led to Kongwak woodlice being the first genetically confirmed hosts of Invertebrate iridescent virus 31 in the southern hemisphere.

References 

Towns in Victoria (Australia)
Shire of South Gippsland